Rionero Sannitico is a comune (municipality) in the Province of Isernia in the Italian region Molise, located about  northwest of Campobasso and about  northwest of Isernia.

References

Cities and towns in Molise